Aepus robinii is a species of beetle in the family Carabidae.

Description
The colour of it is yellowish-red.

Distribution
The species can be found along the Mediterranean-Atlantic coast, from the British Isles to the Iberian Peninsula. It has also been recorded from Ireland.

Ecology
Lives from sandstones and seashores, to fissured marine rocks.

References

Beetles described in 1849
Trechinae